Larco is an Italian surname.

US Immigration
Between 1860 and 1948, most immigrants named Larco came from Peru, France, and Italy. Many of them sailed across the Atlantic Ocean on the Santa Elisa. Most Larco immigrants to the U.S. arrived in 1929 with New York City being the most popular arrival destination with records of 110 immigrants.

Distribution
Based on the 2002 United States White Pages, the Larco surname is ranked 113,592 out of 1,778,655 total unique surnames.

People with the surname
Rafael Larco Hoyle (b. 1901), Peruvian Archaeologist
Guillermo Larco Cox (b. 1932), Peruvian Civil Engineer and Politician
Luis T. Larco, Peruvian Politician
Michael Angelo Larco (b. 1977), Violist with Los Angeles Philharmonic

Places
Larco Museum, also known as Museo Larco. Peruvian museum of pre-Columbian civilizations in Lima

References

 The Larco Name in History, Ancestry.com, June 23, 2007

Surnames